Montclair is a neighborhood in Fayetteville, North Carolina and is located between Raeford, Cliffdale, and Skibo Roads.

Geography of Fayetteville, North Carolina
Neighborhoods in North Carolina